Portal de Usme is one of the terminal stations in the TransMilenio mass-transit system of Bogotá, Colombia, opened in the year 2000.

Location
Portal de Usme is located in the extreme south of Bogotá, specifically on Avenida Caracas south of the La Picota national penitentiary.

History

In 2001, a few months after the opening of the system, the Portal de Usme was opened as the second terminal station in the system.

After a lawsuit from a passenger complaining of lack of handicapped access on the feeder routes at the station, the fleet of feeder buses was renovated to accommodate this service in 2005.

On February 2, 2002, police thwarted an attempt to use dynamite against the station by disarming six sticks of the explosive.

Station services

Old trunk services

Current trunk services

Feeder routes
The terminal operates the following feeder routes:

  Santa Librada loop
  Chuniza loop
  Alfonso López loop
  Usminia loop
  Danubio loop
  Virrey loop
  Marichuela loop
  Usme-Centro loop
  La Fiscala loop
  Compostela loop
  Nebraska loop
  El Uval loop

Inter-city service

Due to its location near the mountainous south of the city, the station does not have inter-city service.

External links
TransMilenio

See also
Bogotá
TransMilenio
List of TransMilenio stations

TransMilenio
Usme
2001 establishments in Colombia